Adamson Awards is a Swedish award awarded to notable cartoonists, named after the famous Swedish comic strip "Adamson" (Silent Sam).

They have been presented by the Swedish Academy of Comic Art (SACA) since 1965.  There have been years in that time when neither award or only one of the two awards was presented.

Best International Comic-Strip [or comic book] Cartoonist
1965 – Chester Gould, USA; Dick Tracy
1966 – Harvey Kurtzman, USA; Djungelboken; skapare av Mad (The Jungle Book; creator of Mad)
1967 – Charles M. Schulz, USA; Snobben (Peanuts)
1968 – Jean-Claude Forest, France; Barbarella
1969 – Harold R. Foster, USA; Prins Valiant (Prince Valiant)
1970 – Robert Crumb, USA; Fritz the Cat, etc.
1971 – Hergé (Georges Remi), Belgium; The Adventures of Tintin
1972 – Guido Crepax, Italy; Valentina, etc.
1974 – René Goscinny, France; Asterix, Lucky Luke, etc.
1975 – Mort Walker, USA; "Knasen" (Beetle Bailey) and Sams serie (Sam's Strip) etc.
1976 – John Hart, USA; B.C.
1977 – Lee Falk, USA; Mandrake and Fantomen (Mandrake and The Phantom)
1979 – Moebius (Jean Giraud), France; Blueberry, etc.
1980 – André Franquin, Belgium; Spirou et Fantasio and Gaston
1981 - Gérard Lauzier, France; Sånt är livet (Tranches de vie) etc. 
1983 - Caza (Philippe Cazaumayou), France; Mardrömmarnas stad (Scènes de la vie de banlieue), etc.
1985 (The Swedish Academy of Comic Art 20th Year Celebration) (tie): 
Brant Parker, USA; Trollkarlen from Id (The Wizard of Id); 
Jerry Dumas, USA; Sams serie and Sam och Silo (Sam's Strip and Sam and Silo) 
Sergio Aragonés; USA; Groo, etc.; 
Burne Hogarth, USA; Tarzan; 
Jerry Siegel, USA; Superman
1986 – Jacques Tardi, France; Adéle Blanc-Sec, etc.
1987 – Claire Bretécher, France; De frustrerade (Frustrés)
1988 – Art Spiegelman, USA; Maus
1989 – (tie):
Bud Grace, USA; Ernie
Don Martin, USA; strips from Mad
1990 – Frank Miller, USA; recreation of Batman and Daredevil
1991 – Bill Watterson, USA; Kalle and Hobbe (Calvin and Hobbes)
1992 – Bill Sienkiewicz, USA; Daredevil, and graphic experiments
1993 – Neil Gaiman, England; The Sandman, etc.
1994 – Scott McCloud, USA; Understanding Comics
1995 – Scott Adams, USA; Herbert and Herbert (Dilbert)
1996 – Jeff Smith, USA; Bone
1997 – Patrick McDonnell, USA; Morrgan och Klös (Mutts)
1998 – Don Rosa, USA; (Donald Duck)
1999 – Enki Bilal, France; (Nikopol)
2000 – Alan Moore, England; (Watchmen, Tom Strong)
2001 – Jim Meddick, USA; (Robotman/Monty)
2002 – tie:
Daniel Clowes, USA; (Ghost World)
Jerry Scott, USA; Baby Blues, Nancy, Zits
2003 – Chris Ware, USA; (Jimmy Corrigan, the Smartest Kid on Earth, The Acme Novelty Library)
2004 – Joe Sacco, USA; (Palestine)
2005 – Jim Borgman, USA; (Zits)
2006 – Frode Øverli, Norway; (Pondus)
2007 – Garry Trudeau, USA; Doonesbury
2008 – Charles Burns, USA; Black Hole
2009 – Jean Van Hamme, Philippe Francq, Belgium; Largo Winch
2010 – Peter Madsen, Denmark
2011 – Bill Willingham, USA; 
2012 – Terry Moore
2013 – Alejandro Jodorowsky
2014 – Pierre Christin, Jean-Claude Mézières
2015 – Sussi Bech, Marjane Satrapi
2016 – David Mazzucchelli

Best Swedish Comic-Strip [or comic book] Cartoonist
1965 – Rudolf Petersson; 91:an
1966 – Elov Persson; Kronblom and 
1967 – Rit-Ola (Jan-Erik Garland); Biffen and Bananen
1968 – Jan Lööf; Felix
1969 – Rune Andréasson; Bamse
1970 – Torvald Gahlin; Klotjohan and Fredrik
1971 – Torsten Bjarre; Flygsoldat 113 Bom
1972 – Rolf Gohs; Mystiska 2:an
1975 – Nils Egerbrandt; Olli and 91:an
1976 – Gösta Gummesson; Åsa-Nisse
1981 – Gunnar Persson; Kronblom
1983 – Ulf Lundkvist; Mannen med den långa håriga näsan in ETC
1986 – Joakim Pirinen; Socker-Conny etc.
1987 – Gunna Grähs; Evert and Tyra
1988 – Lars Hillersberg; 50-talet
1990 – Leif Zetterling; Nils Holgersson flyger igen
1991 – Lena Ackebo; strips in the publication Galago
1992 – Joakim Lindengren; strips in the publications Galago and Pyton
1993 – Charlie Christensen; Arne Anka
1994 – Gunnar Lundkvist; Klas Katt and Olle Ångest, etc.
1995 – Max Andersson; the volume Vakuumneger, etc.
1996 – Jan Romare; Pyton, Himlens Änglar, Ugglan Urban, etc.
1997 – Jan Berglin 
1998 – Mats Källblad 
1999 – Patrik Norrman 
2000 – Monica Hellström; "Ärligt talat"
2001 – Claes Reimerthi & Hans Lindahl; Fantomen (The Phantom)
2002 – Lars Mortimer; "Hälge" 
2003 – Martin Kellerman; "Rocky"
2004 – Tony Cronstam 
2005 – David Nessle 
2006 – Johan Wanloo
2007 – Nina Hemmingsson
2008 – Sven-Bertil Bärnarp
2009 – Ola Skogäng
2010 – Anneli Furmark
2011 – Kim W. Andersson, Lina Neidestam
2012 – Jonas Darnell, Liv Strömquist
2013 – Sara Granér
2014 – Daniel Ahlgren
2015 –  Peter Bergting, Malin Biller
2016 –  Knut Larsson, Ellen Ekman

Golden Adamson (for lifetime comic medium achievement)
1986 – Lee Falk, USA; (The Phantom, Mandrake the Magician) 
1988 – Mort Walker, USA; (Beetle Bailey, Hi & Lois)
1990 – Carl Barks, USA; (Donald Duck)
1992 – Stan Lee, USA; (Fantastic Four, Spider-Man, Hulk)
1997 – Marten Toonder, Netherlands; (Tom Poes)
1998 – Will Eisner, USA; (The Spirit, various graphic novels)

See also
Urhunden Prizes (another Swedish comics award)

References

Adamson Awards at Comic Book Awards Almanac site

External links
Official site (Swedish)

Comics awards
Gothenburg
Culture in Gothenburg
Swedish awards
Awards established in 1965
1965 establishments in Sweden